Johan Johansson, Johan Johansson i Kälkebo, was born 14 September 1866 in , Hälsingland, Sweden. He died 22 June 1928 in an accident with a train in  near Bollnäs. He was a Swedish politician, member of the parliament (C) and farmer.

References
This article was initially translated from the Swedish Wikipedia article.

Members of the Riksdag from the Centre Party (Sweden)
1866 births
1928 deaths
Members of the Första kammaren